Flames (stylized as FLAMES) is a youth-oriented Philippine television drama anthology show produced and broadcast by ABS-CBN. The series was broadcast from April 8, 1996 to January 11, 2002 every weekday afternoons. It aired for five years as an afternoon weekday drama on television.

Film adaptation

Flames (or FLAMES: The Movie) is a 1997 Philippine film produced by Star Cinema. The movie was also a first anniversary offering of its primetime (later daytime) drama series that ran from 1996 to 2002.  The movie is separated into two episodes: Tameme, which stars Jolina Magdangal, Bojo Molina and Marvin Agustin and Pangako which stars Rico Yan and Claudin Baretto. The episodes were directed by Jerry Lopez Sineneng and Khryss Adalia respectively.

The film's theme song was Flames, performed by Jeffrey Hidalgo. The Flames Original Motion Picture Soundtrack garnered gold album status.

Cast

Tameme cast
Jolina Magdangal as Leslie
Marvin Agustin as Butch
Bojo Molina as Rolly
Marianne dela Riva as Leslie's mother
Daria Ramirez as Tita Elena
Toby Alejar as Leslie's father
Ray Ventura as Tito Rodel
Mel Kimura
Lorena Garcia as Ada
Jeffrey Hidalgo
JR Herrera as Chito
Kaye Abad as Jenny
Cheska Garcia as Dianne

Pangako cast
Claudine Barretto as Karina
Rico Yan as Joel
Paula Peralejo as Yvette
Boots Anson-Roa as Dona Amparo
Marita Zobel as Mrs Ronquillo
Perla Bautista
Marc Solis as Emil
Emman Abeleda as Sammy
Jan Marini Alano as Aida
Richard Quan
Gerard Pizzaras as Andie

See also
List of programs broadcast by ABS-CBN

References

External links
 

1997 films
Star Cinema films
Filipino-language films
Philippine drama films
1996 Philippine television series debuts
2002 Philippine television series endings
1990s Philippine television series
ABS-CBN drama series
Philippine anthology television series
Filipino-language television shows